Hadjipanayis, Hatzipanagis is a Greek surname. Notable people with the surname include:
George C. Hadjipanayis, Greek physicist
Vasilis Hatzipanagis (born 1954), Greek footballer

Greek-language surnames